North is a cardinal direction or compass point.

North or The North may also refer to:

Places
 North, South Carolina, a town in the United States
 North (London sub region), a sub-region of the London Plan
 Northern Canada or the North, northernmost region of Canada 
 Northern England or the North, the northern part of England considered as a cultural area
 North Wales, a geographical region in Wales.
 The North, an alternative name for Northern Ireland
 Northern United States or the North, geographic or historical term for regions of the United States
 North (American Civil War), national government of President Abraham Lincoln and 24 states supporting it
 Nordic countries or Norden, a region in Northern Europe and the North Atlantic
 Northern Italy or Nord, a geographical region in Italy
 Northern Cyprus, de facto state on the Island of Cyprus

Music
 North (band), an Australian boy band
 North (Darkstar album), the debut album of Darkstar
 North (EP),  by Ego Likeness, 2009
 North (Elvis Costello album), 2003
 North (Logh album),  2007
 North (Mary Dillon album), 2013
 North (Matchbox Twenty album), 2012
 North (Something Corporate album), 2003
 "North", a song by Afro Celt Sound System on the album Volume 3: Further in Time
 "North", a B-side by Björk
 "North", a song by Coil on Winter Solstice: North, 1999, and re-released on the Moon's Milk (In Four Phases) double CD, 2002
 "North", a song by Paul Mounsey on the album NahooToo
 The North (Stars album), 2012
 The North, an album by Men of North Country

Literature
 North (poetry collection), collection by Seamus Heaney
 North (novel), by Louis-Ferdinand Céline, 1960
 North, a 2004 novel by Donna Jo Napoli

Film and television
 North (1994 film), an American comedy film 
 North (2009 film), a Norwegian film
 "North" (Fear the Walking Dead), a television episode

Other uses
 North (surname), list of people with surname North
 NORTH (eSports team), gaming team
 North Limited, a former Australian mining company
 The North (professional wrestling), a tag team in Impact Wrestling comprising Josh Alexander and Ethan Page
 North “Nori” West, eldest daughter of Kim Kardashian and Kanye West

See also
 Global North, the developed countries of the world
 Upper Midwest, a sub-region of the United States
 Far North (disambiguation)
 Nord (disambiguation), French, Italian, Danish and Catalan for north
 Norte (disambiguation), Spanish, Portuguese and Galician for north
 North River (disambiguation)
 Northern Region (disambiguation)
 Northward (disambiguation)